Suzane George is a Tamil actress, acting both in movies and TV serials. She is also known as "Mynaa Suzane.”

Career

Television 
Her first break in television was with Jaya TV as a VJ: she hosted the show Thagaval Dot Com in Kalai Malar. Her first serial was Khakki. She has played a variety of roles, ranging from an auto driver in the serial Thendral to an IT project manager in Office. She won 4th place in a cooking reality show Kitchen SuperStar of Star Vijay. She was also a finalist of the show 60 Nodi, Are you ready?.

Acting credits

Films

Television

References

External links

Living people
Indian television actresses
1987 births
Actresses from Thiruvananthapuram
Tamil actresses
Actresses in Tamil television
Tamil television actresses
Actresses in Tamil cinema
21st-century Indian actresses